Royal Tyler Sprague (January 23, 1814 – February 24, 1872) was the 11th Chief Justice of California.

Biography
Sprague taught elementary school in Potsdam, New York and later opened a school in Zanesville, Ohio. In 1838 he began to study law and was admitted to the bar in Ohio. The finding of gold in the Sierra Nevada prompted Sprague to become a "Forty-Niner". After arriving in California in September 1849, Sprague worked a claim on Clear Creek on the Sacramento River. He settled in Reading's Springs, now Shasta, California, and once again became an attorney.

In 1852, he was elected to the California State Senate representing the 18th District, and in 1855 served as its President pro tempore.

In 1867, Sprague was elected to the Supreme Court of California as a Democrat; he was chosen to be Chief Justice in January 1872 and died the next month. He is interred in Sacramento Historic City Cemetery.

A collection of his journals is in the Bancroft Library at the University of California, Berkeley.

Personal life
On, May 30, 1844, he married Francis Blocksom at Muskingum, Ohio. In 1852, Sprague returned to Ohio briefly to retrieve his wife and their family; they returned to California with him. The couple had four children: Anna Maria Sprague (1845–1879); Arthur Hale Sprague (1848–1922); Ella Sprague (1853-1855); and Frances Royal Sprague (1864–1957).

References

External links
 In Memoriam Royal T. Sprague. 43 Cal. Rpts. 3 (1872). California Supreme Court Historical Society. Retrieved July 18, 2017.
 Past & Present Justices. California State Courts. Retrieved July 19, 2017.

See also
 List of justices of the Supreme Court of California
 Joseph B. Crockett
 William T. Wallace
 Jackson Temple

1814 births
1872 deaths
Chief Justices of California
People of the California Gold Rush
People from New Haven, Vermont
U.S. state supreme court judges admitted to the practice of law by reading law
Justices of the Supreme Court of California
19th-century American judges
Superior court judges in the United States
Democratic Party California state senators
19th-century American politicians